The list of shipwrecks in October 1874 includes ships sunk, foundered, grounded, or otherwise lost during October 1874.

1 October

2 October

3 October

4 October

5 October

6 October

7 October

8 October

9 October

10 October

11 October

12 October

13 October

14 October

15 October

16 October

17 October

18 October

19 October

20 October

21 October

22 October

{{shipwreck list item
|ship=Albert''' 
|flag=
|desc=The ship was driven ashore at the Little Orme Head, Caernarfonshire, United Kingdom. Her crew were rescued. She was on a voyage from Corpus Christi, Texas, United States to Liverpool, Lancashire, United Kingdom.
}}

23 October

24 October

25 October

26 October

27 October

28 October

29 October

30 October

31 October

Unknown date

References

Bibliography
Ingram, C. W. N., and Wheatley, P. O., (1936) Shipwrecks: New Zealand disasters 1795–1936.'' Dunedin, NZ: Dunedin Book Publishing Association.

1874-10
Maritime incidents in October 1874